Acrodipsas is a genus of butterflies in the family Lycaenidae. There are ten species in this genus all endemic to the Australasian realm:
Acrodipsas arcana -  black-veined ant-blue
Acrodipsas aurata - golden ant-blue
Acrodipsas brisbanensis - bronze ant-blue
Acrodipsas cuprea - copper ant-blue
Acrodipsas decima - Decima ant-blue
Acrodipsas hirtipes - black ant-blue
Acrodipsas illidgei - Illidge's ant-blue, mangrove ant-blue
Acrodipsas melania - grey ant-blue     
Acrodipsas mortoni - brown ant-blue
Acrodipsas myrmecophila - small ant-blue

External links
 Tree of Life Acrodipsas

 
Luciini
Butterflies of Australia
Lycaenidae genera